Jana Čepelová was the defending champion, but lost in the first round to Réka Luca Jani.

Viktória Kužmová won the title, defeating Ekaterina Alexandrova in the final, 6–3, 4–6, 6–1.

Seeds

Draw

Finals

Top half

Bottom half

References
Main Draw

Hungarian Pro Circuit Ladies Open - Singles
 
2018 in Hungarian women's sport
2018 in Hungarian tennis